Igor Radojičić (born 13 September 1966) is a Bosnian Serb politician who served as mayor of Banja Luka from 2016 until 2020. He served as the 5th Speaker of the National Assembly of Republika Srpska as well. Also, following the death of President Milan Jelić, he was acting President of Republika Srpska from 1 October 2007 until 28 December 2007.

Radojičić was born in Banja Luka and holds an M.Sc. degree in electrical engineering. In the late 1980s, he was a member of the leadership of the Association of Socialist Youth of Bosnia and Herzegovina and until 2022 the Secretary General of the Alliance of Independent Social Democrats (SNSD), a Serb social democratic party in Bosnia and Herzegovina. Radojičić held the office of Speaker of the National Assembly from 28 February 2006 until 28 November 2014.

He is married to Sanja Radojičić and is a father of two.

References

External links

The exclusive interview with Igor Radojičić at balkaninside.com

1966 births
Living people
People from Banja Luka
Serbs of Bosnia and Herzegovina
Serbian people of Montenegrin descent
Alliance of Independent Social Democrats politicians
Speakers of the National Assembly of Republika Srpska
Presidents of Republika Srpska
Mayors of Banja Luka